Coprosma niphophila, the creeping coprosma, is a shrub native to Australia and the south island of New Zealand. The specific epithet (niphophila) is derived from ancient Greek meaning "snow-loving", referring to the alpine habitat of this plant. The type specimen was collected near the Upper Blue Lake Cirque near Mount Kosciuszko, New South Wales.

References

Flora of New South Wales
Flora of Tasmania
Flora of New Zealand
Plants described in 1987
niphophila